Khaled Al-Qazzaz (born July 3, 1979) is an educator, philanthropist, and human rights activist based in Egypt and Canada. He is a Canadian-educated Mechanical Engineer, and former school director. Khaled was a staffer, bureaucrat, and civil servant of the democratically elected government led by Mohamed Morsi in Egypt between (30 June 2012 and July 3, 2013). Even though the government was chosen by the Freedom and Justice Party (FJP), the political wing of the Muslim Brotherhood (MB), Khaled is not a member of the Muslim Brotherhood.  Khaled was forcibly detained by the Egyptian military On July 3, 2013, along with the president and eight other government aides. Khaled remained in an unknown military location for five and a half months. During this time, the Egyptian regime refused to acknowledge that it was holding Khaled or to confirm his whereabouts, putting him outside the protection of the law. Khaled was transferred to Tora Prison (Scorpion Wing) on December 17, 2014, and held in solitary confinement for nine months.  On October 26, 2014, Khaled continued his detention in a private hospital for three months due to injuries sustained as a result of the extreme conditions of his confinement. As a result of efforts spearheaded by his Canadian wife Sarah Attia with the Free Khaled Al-Qazzaz Campaign (FreeKQ Campaign), Khaled was released on January 11, 2015. Despite his release and cleared legal position, Khaled had been unable to return to Canada for unknown reasons. Khaled waited another 19 months for a return to Canada and was in need of immediate medical attention.  Toronto-born Sarah Attia and the Free Khaled al-Qazzaz campaign had been calling on Canadian and Egyptian governments as well as the international community to urgently assist in securing Khaled’s immediate return to Canada.

On August 14, 2016, Khaled finally landed back in Toronto after he was abruptly cleared to return to Canada.  This ended a three-year ordeal.  Shortly after their return, Khaled and his wife Sarah Attia were welcomed by the honorable Minister Stephane Dion and his team at the Global Affairs Canada office in Ottawa.  They thanked Minister Dion and his team for the diplomatic leadership shown to bring the family home.  The family expressed gratitude to all Canadians, human rights activists, journalists, and government officials who dedicated their time and effort to resolving the ordeals of Canadian families abroad.

Presently, both Khaled and Sarah are working actively on the development of their new foundation, the Al-Qazzaz Foundation for Education and Development, where they hope to give back to Canada and the world. The foundation will focus on delivering  services and support to disadvantaged communities through innovative online technologies and will launch its first project for Syrian Refugees who have arrived in Canada. By offering cultural awareness, English language services, and mental health support, Sarah and Khaled hope to contribute to the great work the Canadian government started one year ago.

Personal life

Khaled Al-Qazzaz was born in Cairo, Egypt to Adly Moustafa Al-Qazzaz and Amal Mansour. He has 5 siblings. He is married to Canadian Sarah Attia, whom he met while both were graduate students studying engineering at the University of Toronto. Together, they worked on several campus and community based projects. They married and moved to Cairo in 2005, with plans to return to Canada. They have four children: Abdelrahman, 9, Amena, 7, Fatema, 5, and Tahrir, 3.

Education

Khaled grew up in the United Arab Emirates and went to the Emirates Private School (British education system), where he completed most of his schooling. Khaled returned to Egypt to do a bachelor's degree in mechanical engineering at the American University in Cairo (AUC), where he graduated with honors. He was also a participant in several student clubs and societies at AUC, including the Mechanical Engineering Club, where he served as President, the Volleyball and Rowing teams, where he was captain, the Poetry Society and the Model Arab League. Khaled received the Most Valuable Player (MVP) award in volleyball and was nominated for the Parents Association Cup awarded for most active students on campus. 
Khaled moved to Toronto, Canada in 2000 to do a master's degree in mechanical engineering at the University of Toronto (UofT) after receiving a scholarship from UofT. He achieved his degree in 2003. Currently, Khaled is completing his Doctorate of Education from Walden University (an online American university).

Canada

Khaled met his future wife, Sarah Attia, at the University of Toronto and they worked together on several campus and community-based projects. They married and moved to Cairo in 2005, with plans to return to Canada. Khaled and Sarah have 4 children: Abdelrahman, 9, Amena, 7, Fatema, 5, and Tahrir, 3.

During his time at UofT, Khaled led student-run initiatives, such as 'Students for World Justice', which raised awareness about the plights of marginalized and persecuted communities all over the world, the Orphan Sponsorship Program, which raised money for 300 orphans in its first year, and social justice initiatives serving the homeless and poor in their local neighborhoods. Khaled also engaged in interfaith initiatives and activities promoting tolerance and understanding with different communities and societies.

Egypt

In 2005, Khaled returned to Egypt and began work in the field of education in an International School (Mokatam Language School in Egypt) that runs kindergarten through Grade 12. 
Khaled joined Mokatam Language School in Egypt in June 2005 as the Director of the International Section, which he co-founded in the same year. Between 2008 and 2012 Khaled received a profit share as part of his new contract. On acceptance of his official government position Khaled gave up his position and share at the school. Since 2012, Khaled has not been involved with the school.

His work in education led to his involvement as a volunteer professional member of Advanced, an international accreditation agency for schools, where he volunteered in professional teams accrediting schools in the Middle East and North Africa region.

Political experience

During the events of the Egyptian revolution in January 2011, Khaled participated in widespread demonstrations against Egypt's 30-year dictatorship.  When the first free presidential elections were announced, Khaled became a volunteer campaigner for the Freedom and Justice Party (FJP).

After the FJP won the democratic election in June 2012, Khaled was asked to work for the government as a civil servant in recognition of his international experience gained from his studies abroad. Khaled worked in the secretariat of foreign relations coordinating with the Ministry of Foreign Affairs promoting democracy, good governance and working on the human rights portfolio.

Human rights work

During his term in the Presidential Office, Khaled Al-Qazzaz was directly involved in developing new strategies for democracy. Among these initiatives, Khaled is credited with being the first to initiate a Human Rights Portfolio and desk at the Egyptian Presidency. The human rights initiative had the following mandate:

 Evaluate the current situation of human rights in Egypt.
 Propose a long term strategy to create a rights environment among the institutions and individuals.
 Propose revisions and amendments to laws that are not compatible with human rights.

Khaled is credited with taking the following steps related to the human rights mandate in Egypt:

 Called for a coordinator for human rights position in the presidential office
 Sent a call for rights organizations to send their amendments on the articles of the constitution to be adopted by the presidency 
 Proposed the Non-Governmental Organization (NGO) draft law which was based upon creating a free and encouraging environment for NGOs 
 Invited human rights organizations into the Presidential Office to engage them in developing the human rights agenda at the Presidency office

Women's rights activism

Khaled helped lay out the following objectives for the Women’s Empowerment Portfolio:

 Evaluate the current situation of women’s rights in Egypt.

 Propose a long-term strategy to develop opportunities for women and create a model for social justice and empowerment for women in Egypt.

Khaled’s work in the Women’s Empowerment Portfolio resulted in more than 20 hearing sessions with various women-centered organizations (national and international). He helped launch the Egyptian initiative for ensuring women's rights hosted by the Presidency, which held workshops with stakeholders to formulate a national plan for women's rights. 
Khaled also initiated the process to open a UN Women's Office in Egypt.

Education activism

Alongside his political involvement, Khaled continued to advocate for investment in education and education reform as a priority for post-revolution Egypt. Khaled was also keen on developing a unique educational system that would be directly relevant to Egyptian students. Khaled’s vision for education in Egypt included an active role for civil society and the private sector in articulating the policies and priorities for a uniquely Egyptian education system.

Regarding the importance of education initiatives in Egypt, Khaled was quoted on the popular radio show “Good Morning Egypt” as saying: “There is no nation, among the nations that have succeeded in the last 50- 60 years – Japan, Germany, Malaysia – all the countries in the East and West, have not advanced economically, or socially, except [and] until they placed education as a clear priority… It is possible to see a huge renaissance in education within the next year if all the people work in the same direction” (Khaled Al-Qazzaz, speaking on "Good Morning Egypt", February 21, 2012)

Imprisonment

On July 3, 2013, Al-Qazzaz was forcibly detained by the Egyptian military along with the president and eight other government aides.  Khaled remained in an unknown military location for five and a half months, during which time the Egyptian regime refused to acknowledge that it was holding Khaled or to confirm his whereabouts, putting him outside the protection of the law.

On December 1, 2013, Human Rights Watch issued a statement accusing the Egyptian government of forcibly disappearing Al-Qazzaz for almost five months. The statement read that Al-Qazzaz “remains detained without any legal basis at an undisclosed location.”

Under international law, Khaled's case is one of an enforced disappearance. Enforced disappearance violates many of the rights guaranteed under the International Covenant on Civil and Political Rights, which Egypt ratified in 1982, including the requirement to bring detainees promptly before a judge. The 1992 UN Declaration on the Protection of All Persons from Enforced Disappearances, stipulates that detainees must be held in officially recognized places of detention, of which their families must be promptly informed; that they must have access to a lawyer; and that each detention facility must maintain an official up-to-date register of everyone in that facility deprived of their liberty.

Solitary Confinement

On December 17, 2014 Khaled was transferred to a maximum security prison (Scorpion Wing in Tora Prison) and held in solitary confinement for over nine months. Reports later revealed that Al-Qazzaz was held in solitary confinement in a two by two meter cell in one of Egypt’s most notorious prisons. Reports in international newspapers have shown the conditions of Al-Qazzaz’s confinement. The cell was reportedly overrun with insects, while Al-Qazzaz had no access to clean clothes, pen or paper, a way to tell time, or windows. As a result of the harsh conditions of his detainment, Al-Qazzaz’s health has greatly deteriorated, leaving him with spinal complications and at risk for paralysis.

During his confinement, Al-Qazzaz and his lawyers appeared in court on numerous occasions as a part of the legal proceedings to call for an end to his detainment. Many of the court appearances ended with the judge extending Al-Qazzaz’s detainment for another 45 days for further investigations without legal explanation.

Hospitalization and release

On October 26, 2014, Khaled was moved to a private hospital where he continued his detention for over three months due to injuries sustained as a result of the extreme conditions of his confinement.

On Monday, December 29, 2014, the Attorney General issued an order for Al-Qazzaz’s release. This meant that investigations with Khaled came to an end and no charges would be issued. Khaled was finally released on January 11, 2015.

When Khaled was first detained, the group Friends of Khaled came together to stand with his wife, Sarah Attia, in her efforts to bring her husband back home to Canada.  This was the inception of the FreeKQ (Free Khaled al-Qazzaz) Campaign.  While Friends of Khaled began as a group of university alumni who knew Khaled while he studied at the University of Toronto.  Currently, Friends of Khaled has grown across Canada and internationally to include advocates of human rights.

The FreeKQ campaign has led initiatives such as phone call campaigns, letter-writing campaigns, petition campaigns, and a ‘pay-it-forward.’  The campaign is still active and information can be found on: https://web.archive.org/web/20150108114802/http://www.freekhaledalqazzaz.com/

Return to education

Khaled is currently in Egypt. Though he is legally cleared and is not under any travel bans as confirmed by the Prosecutor General, he has been unable to travel. Khaled’s legal team in Egypt has been working diligently with local authorities to facilitate his return to Canada. As he awaits the opportunity to return to Canada, he has returned to his Doctorate program at Walden University and re-initiated his work in Education consultancy in Egypt.

Statements and interviews

Amnesty International has reported that any charges brought against him would be found deliberately fabricated to make him appear guilty. The United Nations’ Working Group on Arbitrary Detention also made it clear that Khaled’s detention was in violation of Egyptian and International law. Khaled’s detention did not come through any legal process, let alone one that would be consistent with international standards of due process and individual rights.

Press Conferences where human rights activists and leaders have spoken (Monia Mazigh; John Greyson; Alex Neve; Wayne Marston) regarding Khaled have reported consistently that there have never been any charges against Khaled.

While in solitary confinement at Tora Prison, Khaled shared a hand-written statement.

References 

1979 births
Living people